The Department of Innovation, Industry, Science and Research (also called DIISR), was a department of the Australian Government that existed between December 2007 and December 2011. The Department was charged with further developing growth in Australian industries and advancements in science and research. Ministers with responsibility for the department included Kim Carr, Minister for Innovation, Industry, Science and Research and Nick Sherry, Minister for Small Business.

The department was responsible for:
 Manufacturing and commerce including industry and market development
 Industry innovation policy and technology diffusion
 Promotion of industrial research and development, and commercialisation
 Biotechnology, excluding gene technology regulation
 Export services
 Marketing, including export promotion, of manufactures and services
 Investment promotion
 Enterprise improvement
 Construction industry
 Small business policy and implementation
 Business entry point management
 Facilitation of the development of service industries generally
 Bounties on the production of goods
 Trade marks, plant breeders' rights and patents of inventions and designs
 Country of origin labelling
 Weights and measures standards
 Civil space issues
 Analytical laboratory services
 Science policy
 Promotion of collaborative research in science and technology
 Co-ordination of research policy
 Commercialisation and utilisation of public sector research relating to portfolio programs and agencies
 Research grants and fellowships
 Information and communications technology industry development

The Department was made up of several divisions including; Innovation, Manufacturing, Science & Research, Corporate, Industry & Small Business Policy, eBusiness and Questacon. The Enterprise Connect and AusIndustry divisions served as the program delivery arms of the Department.

The department was headed by a Secretary, initially Mark Paterson, who was succeeded in June 2011 by Don Russell.

References

Ministries established in 2007
Innovation, Industry, Science and Research
2013 disestablishments in Australia